Ernest Bretaigne Windust (January 20, 1906 – March 19, 1960) was a United States-based French-born theater, film, and television director.

Early life
He was born in Paris, the son of English violin virtuoso Ernest Joseph Windust and singer Elizabeth Amory Day from New York City. The family escaped to London during World War I, and it was there that he developed an interest in theater. 

They returned to Paris following the war, but Windust's parents divorced in 1920, and he and his mother moved to the United States. He attended Columbia University and then Princeton, where he became a member and later president of the Theatre Intime players.

Career
Planning to become an actor, Windust co-founded with Charles Leatherbee the University Players in 1928 on Cape Cod in Falmouth, Massachusetts. The company lasted five years and included later luminaries Joshua Logan, Henry Fonda, James Stewart, Margaret Sullavan, Mildred Natwick, Eleanor Phelps, Barbara O'Neil, Myron McCormick, Kent Smith, and Aleta Freel.  

Windust directed more often than he acted. Though he began his association with the Theatre Guild in Manhattan as an assistant stage manager in 1929, he maintained his position as a director of the University Players in the off-season when they performed on Cape Cod through mid-1932. He quit the Theatre Guild briefly during the winter season of 1931-32 to direct the University Players through its 18-week winter season in Baltimore.

Windust's first major credit as a professional theatre director was the 1932 West End production of Eugene O'Neill's Strange Interlude. He directed Alfred Lunt and Lynn Fontanne in The Taming of the Shrew and Amphitryon 38 (which he translated from the original French) and appeared with them in Idiot's Delight, his last work as an actor.

Windust's first major Broadway hit was Life with Father, the Russel Crouse/Howard Lindsay play based on the memoirs of Clarence Day, Jr., a distant relative on Windust's mother's side. (At 3,224 performances, it held the record for the longest-running Broadway production for many years. It remains the longest running non musical show in Broadway history.) In quick succession, he followed with Arsenic and Old Lace and Strip for Action, giving him three hits running on Broadway at the same time.
Windust cemented his Broadway career by directing the musical hit Finian's Rainbow (1947). 

In 1947, Windust relocated to Hollywood, where he worked as the dialogue director on Stallion Road starring Ronald Reagan. His film directing career included two 1948 Bette Davis vehicles, the melodramatic Winter Meeting and the screwball comedy June Bride. The latter part of his career was spent working in the television division of Universal, directing episodes of Alfred Hitchcock Presents, Wagon Train, Leave It to Beaver, and Bachelor Father, in addition to the Thanksgiving 1957 special The Pied Piper of Hamelin, later released as a feature film.

Death
On March 19, 1960, Windust was taken to the New York-Presbyterian Hospital for an operation. There he died at the age of 54.

Selected filmography

Director
 June Bride (1948)
 Winter Meeting (1948)
 Perfect Strangers (1950)
 Pretty Baby (1950)
 The Enforcer (1951)
 The Pied Piper Of Hamelin (1957)
 The Thin Man (3 episodes, 1958)
 Alfred Hitchcock Presents (2 episodes, 1959)
 Markham (4 episodes, 1959)
 Wagon Train (3 episodes, 1959)
 Leave It To Beaver (1 episode, 1960)
 Star Time (3 episodes, 1959–1960)
 Bachelor Father (10 episodes, 1959-1960)
 The Jim Backus Show (1 episode, 1960)

Producer
 Climax! (7 episodes, 1954–1955)
 Star Time (2 episodes, 1959–1960)

Broadway credits
 The Hasty Heart (1945)
 State of the Union (1946)
 Finian's Rainbow (1947)

References

External links
 
 
 
 Windust biography at the New York Times

1906 births
1960 deaths
Film directors from Paris
Princeton University alumni
French people of English descent
French emigrants to the United States
French television directors
French television producers
French theatre directors